The OMAR Mine Museum in Kabul, Afghanistan, contains a collection of 51 types of land mines out of the 53 that have been used in that country. OMAR is an acronym for the Organization for Mine Clearance and Afghan Rehabilitation.

Mine collection 

The collection includes unexploded ordnance, cluster bombs and airdrop bombs used by the War in Afghanistan.  The museum educates school groups to detect and avoid unexploded ordnance including landmines and cluster bomblets from historic and ongoing Afghan wars. The museum was seriously damaged in a July 1, 2019 attack.

The museum also displays a variety of other military hardware from wars fought in Afghanistan over the recent decades, including artillery, surface-to-air missiles, and a collection of Soviet military aircraft.

For security reasons, the museum is not open for casual visitors. All appointments must be made through the main OMAR office.

Aircraft on display 

 Su-7
 Yak-40
 L-39
 Mi-8
 MiG-17
 An-2
 Mi-24
 Yak-11

See also
List of museums in Afghanistan

References

 Organisation for Mine Clearance & Afghan Rehabilitation
 Aviation Museum

External links
Blog entries describing visits to the museum:
 The Velvet Rocket.com: OMAR Mine Museum
 TravelBlog.org: OMAR Mine Museum
 Blog.vm.ee—Our Man in Kabul: OMAR Mine Museum

Buildings and structures in Kabul
Military and war museums
Museums in Afghanistan
Aerospace museums
Area denial weapons
Explosive weapons